Cornutus may refer to:

 Lucius Annaeus Cornutus (fl. c. 60 AD), a Stoic philosopher of ancient Rome
 Cornutus (plural: cornuti), a part of the aedeagus of the male Lepidoptera genitalia (butterflies and moths)

See also
 List of Roman cognomina